The Champion Stakes is a greyhound racing competition held annually at Romford Greyhound Stadium.

It was inaugurated at Wimbledon Stadium. However, in 1973 event was discontinued until Romford resurrected it in 1988.

In 2022, the first prize increased to £20,000 following sponsorship from Premier Greyhound Racing (the collaboration between the Arena Racing Company and Entain.

Past winners

+ Smallmead stripped of title following a positive drugs test.

Venues & Distances 
1947-1973 (Wimbledon) 
1988–present (Romford 575m)

Sponsors
1997 (Tony Morris - Track bookmaker)
2005–2005 (Coral)
2006–2007 (Stadium Bookmakers)
2008–2021 (Coral)
2021–present (Premier Greyhound Racing)

References

Greyhound racing competitions in the United Kingdom
Sport in the London Borough of Havering
Recurring sporting events established in 1947
Greyhound racing in London
1947 establishments in England